Results from Norwegian football in the year 1919.

Class A of local association leagues
Class A of local association leagues (kretsserier) is the predecessor of a national league competition.

Norwegian Cup

Third round

|colspan="3" style="background-color:#97DEFF"|7 September 1919

Quarter-finals

|colspan="3" style="background-color:#97DEFF"|28 September 1919

Semi-finals

|colspan="3" style="background-color:#97DEFF"|5 October 1919

Final

National team

Sources:

References

External links
 RSSSF Norway

 
Seasons in Norwegian football